Yangon Region Government is known as Yangon Region Caretaker Government. Current Chief Minister is Hla Soe .

Hla Soe's Yangon Region Administration Council(1 February 2021 – 1 August 2021 ) 

According to the Coup D'état on 1 February 2021 ,the former cabinet was dissolved and formed a new council by the Myanmar Military also known as Yangon Region Administrative Council.

Phyo Min Thein's Yangon Region Cabinet (1 April 2016 – 31 January 2021) 

According to the result of the 2015 Myanmar General Election , National League for Democracy Party won with a landslide victory and formed a cabinet .

Although the term of the cabinet is 5 years , this cabinet could only serve for 4 years & 307 days due to the Coup D'état on 1 February 2021.

Myint Swe's Yangon Region Cabinet (1 April 2011 – 31 March 2016) 

According to the result of the 2010 Myanmar General Election , Union Solidarity and Development Party(the military proxy party formed by the former dictators)won and formed
the cabinet. This cabinet had fully served for 5 years .

Myint Swe's Yangon Division Peace & Development Council (16 April 2001 – 31 March 2011)

Khin Maung Than's Yangon Division Peace & Development Council (15 November 1997 – 15 April 2001)

Myo Nyunt's Yangon Division Law & Order Restoration Council (19 September 1988 – 14 November 1997)

References 
http://www.president-office.gov.mm/?q=cabinet/region-and-state-government/id-10180

State and region governments of Myanmar
Yangon Region